Events from the year 1918 in Russia

Events

January-March 
9 January - the creation of the Volunteer Army was officially announced
18–19 January - Russian Constituent Assembly held its first and last meeting
20 January -  of Andrei Shingaryov and Fyodor Kokoshkin, members of the liberal Cadet Party Central Committee, by the revolutionary sailors
22 January - Ukrainian People's Republic proclaims its independence
23-31 January - 3rd All-Russian Congress of Soviets approved the dissolution of the Constituent Assembly and adopted a resolution "On a new designation of the supreme state power".
27 January - Finnish Civil War begins
28 January - Communist government issues a decree on the foundation of the Red Army
29 January - Battle of Kruty between Ukrainian and Bolshevik forces
30 January - Odessa Soviet Republic proclaimed 
9 February - Ukrainian People's Republic and the Central powers signed the Treaty of Brest-Litovsk
14 February - the Gregorian calendar ("new style") was introduced in Bolshevik-controlled areas. After January 31st, February 14th immediately followed
16 February - Council of Lithuania adopts the act of independence
17 February - beginning of the Ice Cruise of the Baltic Fleet, transferring Russian ships from Reval and Helsingfors to Kronstadt
21 February - the CPC issues the decree named Socialist Homeland is in Danger!
22 February - Ice March of the Volunteer Army begins
24 February - Estonian Declaration of Independence
3 March - Treaty of Brest-Litovsk between the Soviet Russia and the Central powers
11 March - Communist government moves from Petrograd to Moscow
25 March - Belarusian People's Republic proclaimed

April-June 

17 May - beginning of the Revolt of the Czechoslovak Legion
8 June - Committee of Members of the Constituent Assembly founded in Samara and declared itself the holder of the supreme power, acting temporarily on behalf of the Assembly
11 June - ARCEC approved the decree of the Council of People's Commissars "On the organization and supply of the rural poor" creating the kombeds

July-September 
4–10 July - Fifth All–Russian Congress of Soviets
6 July - assassination of German ambassador Wilhelm von Mirbach by Yakov Blumkin precedes the Left SR uprising
10 July - Constitution of the Russian Socialist Federative Soviet Republic adopted by the Congress
17 July - execution of the abdicated emperor Nicholas II of Russia and his family performed in Yekaterinburg by the local Bolsheviks
2 August - Anglo-American troops landed in Arkhangelsk
8 August - beginning of anti-Communist Izhevsk–Votkinsk Uprising 
30 August - Vladimir Lenin assassination attempt by SR Fanny Kaplan
5 September - the CPC proclaims the Red Terror as a response for the Kaplan incident
23 September - Ufa Directory, the reformed anti-Bolshevik government, formed in Ufa

October-December 
29 October - creation of the Russian Communist Youth League
13 November - Bolsheviks renounced the Treaty of Brest-Litovsk two days after Armistice of Compiègne marking defeat of the Central powers in the World War I.
18 November - Admiral Alexander Kolchak seizes power from the Ufa Directory which moved to Omsk month before. The council of ministers appointed him to the post of the Supreme Ruler of Russia (chosen to avoid the words "president" and "regent", believing that the form of government will be determined by the Constituent Assembly after the end of the civil war)
10 December - Sfatul Țării of Bessarabia decided to join Romania. The Romanian annexation of Bessarabia was never recognized by the Soviet government.

Births

 9 September - Boris Zakhoder, poet and translator (died 2000)
 10 December - Anatoly Tarasov, ice hockey player and coach (died 1995)
 11 December - Aleksandr Solzhenitsyn, writer (died 2008)
 15 December - Andrey Titenko, soldier (died 2022)

Deaths
 7 February – Alexander Taneyev, Russian composer (b. 1850)
 1 April - General Paul von Rennenkampf, military commander in Russo-Japanese War and World War I (shot)
 6 April - Savva Mamontov, businessman and philanthropist 
 13 April - General Lavr Kornilov, Supreme Commander of the Russian Army (1917), one of the leaders of the anti-Communist White Movement
 20 June - V. Volodarsky (Moisey Goldstein), Bolsheviks' chief agitator
 25 June - General Sergey Markov, anti-Communist Volunteer Army leader
 22 July - Alexey Schastny, Russian naval officer (b. 1881)
 4 October – Nikolai Skrydlov, admiral (b. 1844)
 9 November – Sergey Andreyevsky, Russian writer, poet, literary critic and lawyer (b. 1847)

References

 
Years of the 20th century in Russia